Teresa Maryańska (1937 – 3 October 2019) was a Polish paleontologist who specialized in Mongolian dinosaurs, particularly pachycephalosaurians and ankylosaurians. Peter Dodson (1998 p. 9) states that in 1974 Maryanska together with Halszka Osmólska were among the first "women to describe new kinds of dinosaurs". She is considered not only as one of Poland's but also one of the world's leading experts on dinosaurs.

A member of the 1964, 1965, 1970, and 1971 Polish–Mongolian expeditions to the Gobi Desert, she has described many finds from these rocks, often with Halszka Osmólska. Among the dinosaurs she has described are: 
 Saichania and Tarchia (1977)
 with Osmólska, Homalocephale, Prenocephale, and Tylocephale (and Pachycephalosauria) (1974), Bagaceratops (1975), and Barsboldia (1981)
 and with Osmόlska and Altangerel Perle, Goyocephale (1982). 
Alan Feduccia notes that Maryanska and her colleagues (Osmólska and Wolsan) produced in 2002 the "most impressive analysis of the oviraptorosaurs".

Amongst her many publications are contributions to three chapters of the 2nd edition of the highly respected The Dinosauria: the chapters on the Therizinosauroidea, the Ankylosauria and on the Pachycephalosauria.

As of 2004, she was affiliated with the Muzeum Ziemi of the Polska Akademia Nauk. She was assistant director of Muzeum Ziemi.

She died on 3 October 2019 at the age of 82.

Selected publications

Books
 T. Maryańska (1970). O gadach bez sensacji. Wydawnictwa Geologiczne.

Articles
 T. Maryańska (1970). Remains of armoured dinosaurs from the uppermost Cretaceous in Nemegt Basin, Gobi Desert. Palaeontologia Polonica 21:23-32.
 T. Maryańska (1971). New data on the skull of Pinacosaurus grangeri (Ankylosauria). Palaeontologia Polonica 25:45-53.
 T. Maryańska and H. Osmólska (1974). Pachycephalosauria, a new suborder of ornithischian dinosaurs. Palaeontologia Polonica 30:45-102.
 T. Maryańska and H. Osmólska (1975). Protoceratopsidae (Dinosauria) of Asia. Palaeontologica Polonica 33:133-181.
 T. Maryańska (1977). Ankylosauridae (Dinosauria) from Mongolia. Palaeontologia Polonica 37:85-151.
 T. Maryańska and H. Osmólska (1981). First lambeosaurine dinosaur from the Nemegt Formation, Upper Cretaceous, Mongolia. Acta Palaeontologica Polonica 26(3-1):243-255.
 T. Maryańska and H. Osmólska (1981). Cranial anatomy of Saurolophus angustirostris with comments on the Asian Hadrosauridae (Dinosauria). Palaeontologia Polonica 42:5-24.
 A. Perle, T. Maryańska, and H. Osmólska (1982). Goyocephale lattimorei gen. et sp. n., a new flat-headed pachycephalosaur (Ornithischia, Dinosauria) from the Upper Cretaceous of Mongolia. Acta Palaeontologica Polonica 27(1-4):115-127.
 T. Maryańska and H. Osmólska (1984). Postcranial anatomy of Saurolophus angustirostris with comments on other hadrosaurs. Palaeontologia Polonica 46:119-141.
 T. Maryańska and H. Osmólska (1985). On ornithischian phylogeny. Acta Palaeontologica Polonica 30(3-4):137-149.
 T. Maryańska (1990). Pachycephalosauria. In: D.B. Weishampel, H. Osmólska, and P. Dodson (eds.), The Dinosauria. University of California Press, Berkeley 564-577.
 T. Maryańska (2000). Sauropods from Mongolia and the former Soviet Union. In: M.J. Benton, M.A. Shishkin, D.M. Unwin, and E.N. Kurochkin (eds.), The Age of Dinosaurs in Russia and Mongolia. Cambridge University Press, Cambridge 456-461.
 T. Maryańska, H. Osmólska, and M. Wolsan (2002). Avialan status for Oviraptorosauria. Acta Palaeontologica Polonica 47(1):97-116.
 J.M. Clark, T. Maryańska, and R. Barsbold (2004). Therizinosauroidea. In: D.B. Weishampel, P. Dodson, and H. Osmólska (eds.), The Dinosauria (second edition). University of California Press, Berkeley 151-164.
 M.K. Vickaryous, T. Maryańska, and D.B. Weishampel (2004). Ankylosauria. In: D.B. Weishampel, P. Dodson, and H. Osmólska (eds.), The Dinosauria (second edition). University of California Press, Berkeley 363-392.

See also
List of biologists
List of geologists
Zofia Kielan-Jaworowska

References

Polish women geologists
Polish paleontologists
1937 births
2019 deaths
Polish scientists
Women paleontologists